Sirens is the second album by Kenneth Newby, released on April 29, 1997 through City of Tribes Records.

Track listing

Personnel 
Musicians
DB Boyko – voice on "Sirens I" and "Sirens II"
Patti Clemens – voice on "Saraswati", "Sirens I", "Fathom", "Infinite" and "Mistress"
Barbara Imhoff – harp "Fathom" and "Infinite"
Stephen Kent – didgeridoo on "Eileithyia"
Eda Maxym – voice on "Sirens II"
Chris Miller – rebab on "Sirens I" and "Sirens II"
Kenneth Newby – suling gambuh, piri, percussion, production, mixing, recording, design
Alex Stahl – double bass on "Howe Sound"
Anis W.A. Sutrisno – voice on "Fathom"
Sutrisno – voice on "Mistress"
Production and additional personnel
Christian Jones – recording
M4 Media – design
Lorraine Thomson – cover art, design

References

External links 
 

1997 albums
Kenneth Newby albums